2012: Supernova is a 2009 direct-to-video science fiction disaster film directed by Anthony Fankhauser and starring Brian Krause, Heather McComb, and Najarra Townsend. It was distributed by The Asylum. As with the previous film, titled 2012: Doomsday, 2012: Supernova is a mockbuster of the Roland Emmerich film  2012, which was released a month later. It is the second film in the Asylum's 2012 trilogy though the films have nothing to do with one another. The third film is titled 2012: Ice Age.

Premise
When a star gone supernova threatens to destroy Earth, an astrophysicist puts together a dangerous and desperate plan to shield Earth from the destructive burst of radiation heading toward it. The movie begins in the year 2010 where a NASA scientist detects a massive asteroid coming towards earth that will crash into the Pacific Ocean and cause the tectonic plates to shift and possibly cause every continent on earth to sink. In order to prevent this the scientist John Cleves decides to ask his wife Sharon bates for help, she tells him that the only way to prevent this is to shield the United States with enough electricity. In the end every continent and country on earth sinks. Only the USA survives surrounded completely by ocean.

Cast
 Brian Krause as Kelvin
 Heather McComb as Laura
 Najarra Townsend as Tina
 Allura Lee as Dr. Kwang Ke
 Alan Poe as Dzerzhinsky
 Londale Theus as Captain Henreaux
 Stephen Schneider as Captain James Moto
 Rob Ullett as NASA Official
 Dana Tomasko as NASA Technician
 Rick L. Dean as NASA Technician
 Pete Angelikus as NASA Technician
 William Joseph Hutchins as NASA Technician
 Doug Newman as NASA Technician
 Jeff Crabtree as NASA Technician
 Maus Jackson as NASA Technician
 J. Dedman as USAF Agent
 Henrik Ej Hermiz as USAF Agent
 Malcom Scott as The President
 Brittian D. Soderberg as NASA Soldier
 Andrew Fetty as NASA Soldier
 Bryan Dodds as NASA Soldier
 Dorothy Drury as Agent Dunne
 Stafford Mills as Farmer Brown
 Kevin Ashworth as Carter
 Stephen Blackehart as Agent Greene
 Matthew Farhat as Lieutenant Shalah
 Melissa Osborne as Eden

Reception
HorrorNews.net reviewed the film, writing that "Frankhauser's depiction of what will happen in 2012 is action packed, but lacks in character development and believability impedes the likability of the movie to a certain extent".

Sequel
Another sequel was released the following year entitled 2012: Ice Age and borrowing elements from another of Roland Emmerich's films, The Day After Tomorrow.

External links
 2012supernova.com

References

2009 films
2009 independent films
2009 science fiction films
Mockbuster films
Films set in 2012
Films set in the future
American science fiction films
American disaster films
The Asylum films
Fiction about supernovae
Fictional NASA people
Apocalyptic films
2000s disaster films
2012 phenomenon
2000s English-language films
2000s American films